Peziza petersii is a species of apothecial fungus belonging to the family Pezizaceae. This is a European species with rather small and irregular brown saucer-shaped ascocarps up to 5 cm in diameter. It is most often encountered in tightly packed groups on burned ground from summer to autumn.

References

Peziza petersii at Species Fungorum

Pezizaceae
Fungi described in 1875
Taxa named by Miles Joseph Berkeley